An American Love is a 1994 Italian romantic comedy film co-written and directed by Piero Schivazappa and starring  Carlo Delle Piane and Brooke Shields.

Plot
Carlo Fossalto, a University of Urbino professor arrives in the United States to teach summer classes in Italian literature at an American Midwest university. His wife has stayed home in Italy to care for family. Greta, an amateur journalist is Carlo's assistant for the summer. The relationship between Greta and Carlo evolves into romance despite the fact he is married.

Cast 

 Carlo Delle Piane as  Carlo Fossalto
 Brooke Shields as  Greta Berling
 Memè Perlini as  Petri
  as Adele
 Kate Guimbellot as Lena
 Richard Joseph Paul as  George
 Emile Levisetti as  Walter

See also   
 List of Italian films of 1994

References

External links

1994 romantic comedy films
Italian romantic comedy films
1994 films
Films set in Marche
1990s Italian-language films
1990s Italian films